Tarnowo Pałuckie  is a village in the administrative district of Gmina Wągrowiec, within Wągrowiec County, Greater Poland Voivodeship, in west-central Poland.

The village has a population of 150. Its church is the oldest wooden building in Poland (14th century).

References

Villages in Wągrowiec County